Love in the Wild is a reality television series that debuted on June 29, 2011, on NBC. The show is created and produced by Endemol USA. The first season was hosted by Darren McMullen; season 2 premiered on June 5, 2012, with new host Jenny McCarthy.

Format
Set in Costa Rica (season 1) or in Dominican Republic and Hawaii (season 2), the series begins with ten men and ten women, paired into couples. The couples must compete in challenges that test their own abilities and their compatibility as a team. Following each episode's adventure, the winning couple spends the night at a luxurious resort called the Oasis, while the other contestants stay in ordinary cabins and socialize with each other. The next day at the choice ceremony, contestants choose their partners for the next episode's challenge. The last remaining unmatched man and woman are eliminated. The series will conclude with one winning couple, who receive a trip around the world.

Choice ceremony and elimination rules
To illustrate the mechanics of the choice ceremony, the following example is provided using these fictional couples:

 Anna and Adam
 Barbra and Bob
 Connie and Carl
 Daisy and Doug

Couples are ordered by their finish in the previous day's challenge. (The gender that chooses first from each couple alternates with each ceremony; i.e., if women go first in one ceremony, men will go first in the next ceremony.)

Anna may choose first whether she would like to stay with Adam or ask someone else to partner with her. Because she and Adam finished first, if either of them wishes to partner with someone else, the other contestant cannot refuse. Anna chooses to stay with Adam, and Adam chooses to stay with Anna. They move on together.

Barbra and Bob are next. Barbra asks Carl to be her partner, and Carl accepts, so Barbra and Carl move on together. Bob asks Connie to be his partner, and Connie refuses. Bob moves to the Singles Area.

Connie may now choose between asking Doug or Bob to partner with her (despite having already rejected Bob). Connie asks Doug to be her partner, and Doug accepts. Connie and Doug move on.

Daisy and Bob are the final two unmatched contestants, and are eliminated.

If Doug had refused to partner with Connie, Connie would have joined Bob in the Singles Area. Daisy and Doug would then each choose to either stay together or ask Bob or Connie to partner up. If Daisy and Doug then both chose to stay together, Daisy and Doug would move on despite finishing last in the challenge, and Bob and Connie would be eliminated.

If there are more than two contestants in the Singles Area after all couples have chosen, the single contestants (in the order of their arrival in the Singles Area) may attempt again to create a partnership with one of the other singles. If all the single contestants continue to decline any partnerships with each other, they will all be eliminated. This feature resulted in the double elimination of Season 1, Episode 6, when the four remaining Singles Area competitors were unable to form any couples.

The show format gives a strong advantage to loyal couples, as they are guaranteed to move ahead as long as they do not finish last in a challenge. (Even then, they will advance if there is anyone in the singles area.) There are few circumstances in which betrayal can be advantageous. (One case being that a member of a last-place couple may accept a switch request, and certain survival for one round, rather than count on a partner's loyalty.) Attempted switches may leave a contestant vulnerable to subsequent retaliation, as in Season 1, when Steele's switch attempt led to a retaliatory rejection by Erica which eliminated both of them. In Season 1, the last three couples had formed romantic bonds which helped protect them from elimination.

Mike and Samantha won Season 1 and earned a trip around the world together.

Season 1 (2011)

Contestants

Men

Women 

 Finished first and immune from elimination, except in episodes 5 and 7
 Eliminated
 Winner
 Runner-up

Updates
Mike and Samantha announced their engagement in March 2013 and got married on April 19, 2014, in San Francisco, California, where they have been living together since the show ended. They have two children: daughter Audrey (born on December 29, 2015) and son Zachary (born February 1, 2018). Heather and Miles have also been residing in San Francisco. The two announced their engagement in March 2015 and were married on June 18, 2016. Their son Macklin was born in August 2018.

Season 2 (2012)

Contestants

Men

Women 

 Finished first and immune from elimination, except in episodes 1,3 and 6
 Eliminated
 Winner
 Runner-up

Updates
Winners Ken and Yanina got married in the Dominican Republic on January 17, 2015. They have two children: daughter Andi (born January 8, 2016) and son Lennox (born August 2018). Ben and Michelle were married on October 26, 2013, but divorced in 2014. Summer and Chase announced their engagement in September 2014. They were married on March 4, 2016. Jesse Wilson was a contestant on SyFy's reality game show Opposite Worlds.

Reception
Love in the Wild received mixed reviews from critics, with Metacritic scoring a 47 out of 100.

Emily Yahr of The Washington Post said that the best part of the show was all about the "sweeping views of Costa Rica", however, it did not go "far enough in any direction to make the premise intriguing to watch."

Love in the Wild premiered to a 2.2/6 rating in adults 18/49 and was watched by 6.48 million viewers. The premiere was the third most watched program of the night, and it was first in its timeslot. The premiere was the seventh most watched show that week.

References

External links
Official Site at NBC
Fans Magazine for Love In The Wild
Love in the Wild on TV.com

2010s American reality television series
2011 American television series debuts
2012 American television series endings
English-language television shows
NBC original programming
Television series by Endemol
Television shows set in Hawaii
Television shows filmed in Costa Rica
Television shows filmed in the Dominican Republic
Television shows filmed in Hawaii
American dating and relationship reality television series